The Federation of the Mexican People's Parties (Federación de Partidos del Pueblo de México) was created in 1951 as an umbrella group for people and parties in Mexico seeking an electoral alternative to the Institutional Revolutionary Party or PRI. 

The founders of the short-lived party included its first and only presidential candidate, Miguel Henríquez Guzmán, who ran under the Federation banner in 1952. He was joined with his brother, the entrepreneur Jorge Henríquez Guzmán, and other high-ranking members of the PRI such as José Muñoz Cota, to create a break-away party of former PRI activists, which they called the Federation of the Mexican People's Parties. Prominent members in this new party included other former generals from the Mexican Revolution such as Genovevo de la O, as well as other political parties such as the Partido Constitucionalista Mexicano (Mexican Constitutionalist Party) led by Francisco J. Mújica. The result was a broad alliance of political, pro-agrarian reform, and social organizations that represented a serious challenge to the practice of presidential succession under the period of PRI domination from 1940 to 1988.
Defunct political party alliances in Mexico
Political organizations based in Mexico
1951 establishments in Mexico